Katie Kerwin McCrimmon (born 1965 in Denver, Colorado) is a journalist and former reporter/analyst for ESPN.  She won the 1979 National Spelling Bee, representing the Rocky Mountain News, by spelling the word "maculature."

McCrimmon's spelling bee win won her a full scholarship to Colorado College, where she graduated with a degree in journalism in 1987. After college, she began to work for the Rocky Mountain News and served as their Washington, D.C. correspondent until 1996 and continued at the paper until it closed in 2009.  In the early 1990s, CNN began broadcasting the National Spelling Bee and invited her to be a commentator.  ESPN2 began broadcasting the contest in 1994, and McCrimmon became their commentator until 2005.

She made a cameo appearance in the 2006 film Akeelah and the Bee.

See also
 List of Scripps National Spelling Bee champions

References

External links
 

1965 births
Living people
American women journalists
Scripps National Spelling Bee participants
Journalists from Colorado
ESPN people
Colorado College alumni
Rocky Mountain News people
20th-century American journalists